Yang Lina (1963 - 20 March 2010), also known as Lina Yang, was a Singaporean actress. She was prominently a full-time Mediacorp artiste from 1983 to 2009 and was often cast as conniving, plotting characters. She died on 20 March 2010 due to uterine cancer, aged 47.

Personal life
Yang became an actress in 1984 after previously working as a bank employee. She had attended an acting class with her younger sister, Yang Libing, and then joined the Singapore Broadcasting Corporation, which is now part of MediaCorp. Her most well known roles included the 1986 film, Neighbours, and Samsui Women.

She married her husband Chau Kim Wa, a make-up artist, in 1992. She took two professional breaks from acting to give birth to her two daughters.

Yang opened a hair salon with her sister in 2004. She was diagnosed with uterine cancer during the late 2000s, but continued to act sporadically. She died of cancer in the home of her younger sister, Yang Libing, on 20 March 2010. Her age was 47. Yang is survived by her younger sister.

Filmography

References

Singaporean film actresses
Singaporean television actresses
20th-century Singaporean actresses
21st-century Singaporean actresses
1963 births
2010 deaths
Deaths from cancer in Singapore
Deaths from uterine cancer